Valsa auerswaldii is a plant pathogen infecting apples.

See also
 List of apple diseases

References

Fungal tree pathogens and diseases
Apple tree diseases
Diaporthales
Fungi described in 1928
Taxa named by Theodor Rudolph Joseph Nitschke